The 2004 NCAA Division I softball season, play of college softball in the United States organized by the National Collegiate Athletic Association (NCAA) at the Division I level, began in January 2004.  The season progressed through the regular season, many conference tournaments and championship series, and concluded with the 2004 NCAA Division I softball tournament and 2004 Women's College World Series.  The Women's College World Series, consisting of the eight remaining teams in the NCAA Tournament and held in Oklahoma City at ASA Hall of Fame Stadium, ended on May 31, 2004.

Conference standings

Women's College World Series
The 2004 NCAA Women's College World Series took place from May 27 to May 31, 2004 in Oklahoma City.

Season leaders
Batting
Batting average: .488 – Autumn Champion, Arizona Wildcats
RBIs: 82 – Holly Groves, South Florida Bulls
Home runs: 24 – Caitlin Benyi, UCLA Bruins

Pitching
Wins: 45-5 & 45-10 – Brooke Mitchell, Louisiana Ragin' Cajuns & Monica Abbott, Tennessee Volunteers
ERA: 0.54 (20 ER/259.0 IP) – Jamie Southern, Fresno State Bulldogs
Strikeouts: 582 – Monica Abbott, Tennessee Volunteers

Records
NCAA Division I season triples:
17 – Dianna Korcak, Jacksonville Dolphins

NCAA Division I single game strikeouts:
28 – Cristin Vitek, Baylor Bears; May 20, 2004 (16 innings)

Freshman class 7 inning single game strikeouts:
20 – Monica Abbott, Tennessee Volunteers; March 26, 2004

Sophomore class consecutive wins streak:
32 – Alicia Hollowell, Arizona Wildcats; February 6-April 24, 2004

Freshman class wins:
45 – Monica Abbott, Tennessee Volunteers

Freshman class shutouts:
24 – Monica Abbott, Tennessee Volunteers

Freshman class strikeouts:
582 – Monica Abbott, Tennessee Volunteers

Team single game doubles:
13 – Charleston Cougars, February 11, 2004

Awards
USA Softball Collegiate Player of the Year:
Jessica van der Linden, Florida State Seminoles

Honda Sports Award Softball:
Jessica van der Linden, Florida State Seminoles

All America Teams
The following players were members of the All-American Teams.

First Team

Second Team

Third Team

References